Buturugeni is a commune located in Giurgiu County, Muntenia, Romania. It is composed of four villages: Buturugeni, Pădureni, Podu Ilfovățului and Poșta.

Natives
 Ioan Niculae

References

Communes in Giurgiu County
Localities in Muntenia